The Ministry of Agriculture is one of the ministries of the Iraqi government. Its task is to manage public and private agriculture in Iraq. Since May 2020 the Minister is Muhammad Karim Jasim Salih.

References

External links
Official website

Government ministers of Iraq